Peter Ashton Barnhart (October 8, 1857  February 27, 1941) was the conductor on the first Canadian Pacific Railway (CPR) transcontinental train in 1886. Barnhartvale, British Columbia, Canada is named after him.

Barnhart Vale Post Office 
In 1905 Barnhart purchased property in what was then known as Campbell Creek and in 1906 opened a post office there. Initially naming his post office "Campbell Creek (South) Post Office", he changed the name to "Barnhart Vale Post Office" in 1909 because of confusions with "Campbell Creek Post Office" established by Lew Campbell at the Campbell Creek Ranch in 1905.

In 1978, the spelling was officially changed to "Barnhartvale".

References

Canadian people in rail transport
Canadian Pacific Railway
Canadian Pacific Railway people
Settlers of British Columbia
1857 births
1941 deaths